Arroios is a station on the Green Line of the Lisbon Metro. The station is located in the Almirante Reis Avenue, in Arroios neighbourhood.

History
The station, which opened on 18 June 1972, was designed by the architect Denis Gomes with art installations by the painter Maria Keil.

On 19 July 2017, the station was closed for extensive renovations; the station's platforms only had room for 4 cars, requiring use of selective door operation. The platforms were expanded from 75 to 105 metres, enabling all stations on the Green Line to be able to support six-car trains. The station reopened on 14 September 2021.

Connections

Urban buses

Carris 
 206 Cais do Sodré ⇄ Senhor Roubado (Metro) (morning service)
 208 Cais do Sodré ⇄ Estação Oriente (Interface) (morning service)
 706 Cais do Sodré ⇄ Estação Santa Apolónia
 708 Martim Moniz ⇄ Parque das Nações Norte
 717 Praça do Chile ⇄ Fetais
 718 ISEL ⇄ Al. Afonso Henriques
 735 Cais do Sodré ⇄ Hospital Santa Maria
 742 Bairro Madre Deus (Escola) ⇄ Casalinho da Ajuda
 797 Sapadores - Circulação

Aerobus 
 Linha 1 Aeroporto ⇄ Cais do Sodré

See also
 List of Lisbon metro stations

References

External links

Green Line (Lisbon Metro) stations
Railway stations opened in 1972
1972 establishments in Portugal